Steffi Graf was the defending champion but did not compete that year.

Second-seeded Irina Spîrlea won in the final 7–6, 6–3 against Julie Halard-Decugis.

Seeds
A champion seed is indicated in bold text while text in italics indicates the round in which that seed was eliminated. The top two seeds received a bye to the second round.

  Amanda Coetzer (quarterfinals)
  Irina Spîrlea (champion)
  Nathalie Tauziat (quarterfinals)
  Ai Sugiyama (quarterfinals)
  Yayuk Basuki (first round)
 n/a
 n/a
  Henrieta Nagyová (quarterfinals)

Draw

Final

Section 1

Section 2

References

External links
 1998 Internationaux de Strasbourg draw

1998
1998 WTA Tour